Kiss Me (French: Embrassez-moi) is a 1929 French silent comedy film directed by Robert Péguy and starring Charles Prince, Suzanne Bianchetti and Jacques Arnna. It was remade in 1932 as a sound film Kiss Me.

Cast
 Charles Prince as Boucatel  
 Suzanne Bianchetti as Marquise Aurore  
 Jacques Arnna as Vicompte de Listrac  
 Hélène Hallier as Géraldine  
 Geneviève Cargese as Comtesse de la Tour d'Argent  
 Henri Richard 
 Félix Barre as Marquis de Champavert  
 Ernest Verne as Gaston de Champavert  
 Marcel Lesieur 
 Eliane Tayar
 Bonaventura Ibáñez

References

Bibliography 
 Dayna Oscherwitz & MaryEllen Higgins. The A to Z of French Cinema. Scarecrow Press, 2009.

External links 
 

1929 films
French silent films
1920s French-language films
Films directed by Robert Péguy
French films based on plays
French black-and-white films
French comedy films
1929 comedy films
Silent comedy films
1920s French films